As President of the United States, Donald Trump had the authority to nominate members of the U.S. Cabinet to the Senate for confirmation under the Appointments Clause, in Article II, Section II, Clause II of the U.S. Constitution.

The media widely speculated about people he could potentially name to the Trump Cabinet. They are listed in order of creation of the cabinet position, which is also used as the basis for the U.S. presidential line of succession.

The Cabinet

Confirmation process
Below is a list of confirmations for Cabinet positions, Cabinet-level positions, and other significant positions that were approved through the Senate between January and May 2017, by a recorded roll-call vote, rather than by a voice vote.

Despite being nominated promptly during the transition period, many cabinet members were unable to take office on Inauguration Day because of delays in the formal confirmation process. , President Trump had fewer cabinet nominees confirmed than any other president except George Washington by the same length of time into his presidency. Part of the lateness was ascribed to the delays in submitting background-check paperwork. The last confirmed Cabinet member, Robert Lighthizer, took office as U.S. Trade Representative on May 11, 2017, four months after his nomination.

Timeline

Senate votes

Candidates for Cabinet positions
After election day, media outlets reported on persons described by various sources as possible appointments to senior positions in the incoming Trump presidency. The number of people which have received media attention as potential cabinet appointees is higher than in most previous presidential elections, partly because the Trump'16 campaign staff (and associated PACs) was significantly smaller and less expensive, thus there are not as many people already expected to receive specific roles in the upcoming Trump administration. In particular, "Trump ha[d] a smaller policy brain trust [policy group] than a new president normally carries" because as an anti-establishment candidate who began his campaign by largely self-funding his way to the Republican party nomination, unlike most previous presidential winners "Trump does not have the traditional cadre of Washington insiders and donors to build out his Cabinet." An additional factor that tends to make the field of potential nominees especially broad, is that unlike most presidential transition teams who select politicians as their appointees, the Trump transition team "has started with a mandate to hire from the private sector [as opposed to the governmental sector] whenever possible."

Secretary of State

Secretary of the Treasury

Secretary of Defense

Attorney General

Secretary of the Interior

Secretary of Agriculture

Secretary of Commerce

Secretary of Labor

Secretary of Health and Human Services

Secretary of Housing and Urban Development

Secretary of Transportation

Secretary of Energy

Secretary of Education

Secretary of Veterans Affairs

Secretary of Homeland Security

Candidates for Cabinet-level officials 
Cabinet-level officials have positions that are considered to be of Cabinet level, but which are not part of the Cabinet.  Which exact positions are considered part of the presidential cabinet, can vary with the president.  The CIA and FEMA were cabinet-level agencies under Bill Clinton, but not George W. Bush.  The head of the Office of National Drug Control Policy (aka the drug czar) was a cabinet-level position under both Bill Clinton and George W. Bush, but not under Barack Obama.  (Not to be confused with the head of the DEA, who has remained in the org chart underneath the cabinet position held by the Attorney General.)  Designation of an agency as being cabinet-level requires that Congress enact legislation, although executive orders unilaterally created by the president can be used to create many other types of position inside the executive branch.  Members of the cabinet proper, as well as cabinet-level officials, meet with the president in a room adjacent to the Oval Office.

Vice president

There were dozens of potential running mates for Trump who received media speculation (including several from New York where Trump himself resided).  Trump's eventual pick of Governor Mike Pence of Indiana was officially announced on July 16, 2016 and confirmed by acclamation via parliamentary procedure among delegates to the 2016 Republican National Convention on July 19, 2016.

White House Chief of Staff

United States Trade Representative

Director of National Intelligence

Ambassador to the United Nations

Director of the Office of Management and Budget

Director of the Central Intelligence Agency

Administrator of the Environmental Protection Agency

Administrator of the Small Business Administration

Removal of the Chair of the Council of Economic Advisers

On February 8, 2017 President Trump outlined the 24 members of the Cabinet with the Chair of the Council of Economic Advisers excluded. In addition to the chair, there are two other members of the council (also appointed by the president), as well as a staff of economists, researchers, and statisticians.

See also

 Presidential transition of Donald Trump
 Inauguration of Donald Trump
 Unsuccessful nominations to the Cabinet of the United States

Notes

References

Trump administration cabinet members